USA Football is the national governing body for amateur American football in the United States. It is an independent non-profit based in Indianapolis, Indiana. USA Football designs and delivers premier educational, developmental and competitive programs to advance, unify and grow the sport. As the sport’s national governing body, member of the U.S. Olympic & Paralympic Committee and organizer of the U.S. national team (men's and women's) for international competition, USA Football partners with leaders in medicine, child advocacy and athletics to support positive football experience for youth, high school and other amateur players. 

USA Football was endowed by the National Football League and the National Football League Players Association in 2002.

Coach Education and Certification

Heads Up Football 
Created by USA Football in 2012, this education and safety program covers fundamental skills and all-sport-relevant athlete health protocols offered nationally. More than 600,000 coach certifications have been completed through the program since 2012.

Nine of the 10 largest U.S. public school districts – and 16 of 20 largest – enrolled in the USA Football program in 2018 on either high school and/or middle school levels. For the second consecutive year, more than 3,000 high schools nationwide enrolled in Heads Up Football in 2018.

Heads Up football is supported by the ACSM, AMSSM, NATA, and the Professional Football Athletic Trainers Society. The program’s significant momentum represents cultural and behavioral change. More Heads Up Football details reside here. Its educational components are:

 Concussion recognition and response
 Heat preparedness and hydration
 Sudden cardiac arrest
 Proper equipment fitting
 Shoulder tackling
 Blocking

USA Football’s 2020 Youth Coach Certification, nationally accredited by the United States Center for Coaching Excellence, was updated this year and is no longer referred to as Heads Up Football, but incorporates the aforementioned educational components in addition to some new content and resources.

Grant Program 
USA Football’s equipment grant program is made possible through the National Football League Foundation. The NFL Foundation is the league’s nonprofit organization representing the 32 NFL clubs. Its mission is to support the health, safety and wellness of athletes, youth football and the communities which support the game.

USA Football’s grant program has delivered the following since 2006:

 Awarded more than $15 million in grants to school-based and youth football programs
 Benefited more than 500,000 youth and high school football players in all 50 states and Washington, D.C.
 Assisted more than 9,500 youth and high school football programs in all 50 states

Youth Tackle Football Practice Guidelines 
Established in 2015, USA Football’s Youth Tackle Football Practice Guidelines may be the only youth sports guidelines to have earned the endorsement of the following sports medicine associations:

 American College of Sports Medicine (ACSM)
 American Medical Society for Sports Medicine (AMSSM)
 National Athletic Trainers’ Association (NATA)
 Combined, these three organizations comprise more than 50,000 members across 90 countries spanning 70 occupations within sports medicine.

USA Football’s guidelines employ the innovation of defining levels of contact (below) and establishes time limits on player-to-player full contact (“thud” and “live” contact).

The guidelines define “thud”-level contact as “full contact” and limits it, unlike other practice guidelines on higher levels of the sport.

These guidelines also address proper heat acclimatization, which was written with advisement from the Korey Stringer Institute at the University of Connecticut.

Board of Directors 
In January 2017, Raymond Odierno, a retired U.S. Army general, was named chairman of USA Football. He was preceded by Carl Peterson, formerly the general manager of the Kansas City Chiefs, who had been chairman since 2009, when he succeeded Jack Kemp. 

, USA Football's Board of Directors includes:

 Gen. Raymond T. Odierno (Ret.), Chairman
 Todd Berry, American Football Coaches Association
 Mike Golic, ESPN
 Roger Goodell*, National Football League
 Cody Hawkins†, University of California-Davis
 Oliver Luck, Private Investor
 Kelly Mehrtens, The Trust
 Dr. Michael McCrea, Medical College of Wisconsin
 Willie McGinest, NFL Network
 Kandice Pritchett Mitchell†, Atlanta Public Schools
 Mark Murphy, Green Bay Packers
 Dr. Karissa Niehoff, National Federation of State High School Associations
 Elizabeth Okey†, Wintrust Financial Corporation
 Dr. Allen Sills, National Football League
 Brad Smithey†, Freeport (Texas) Brazosport High School
 Kevin Warren, Big Ten Conference
 Stan Wilcox, National Collegiate Athletic Association

*Ex officio member

†U.S. Football National Team Alumnus

Partners

USA Football is affiliated with the following sponsor-partnerships:
Catapult
Commerce Bank
FlipGive
Gatorade
Gilman Gear
Hospital for Special Surgery
Musco Lighting
Mobile Virtual Player
National Football League
National Football League Foundation
NBC SportsEngine
NYU Langone Health
OES Scoreboards
Peopletrail
Pop Warner Little Scholars
Port-a-Field
Riddell
TackleBar
Transcend Benefits Group
Volt Athletics

Legal 
In May 2017, after a split that created rival groupings of the International Federation of American Football, the IFAF grouping based in Paris stripped its recognition of USA Football, citing disputes over anti-doping enforcement. IFAF (Paris) instead recognized the United States Federation of American Football as the USA's governing body, and the USFAF organized a collegiate team to participate in the 2017 World Games, in which it won a bronze medal. The grouping of the IFAF based in New York continued to recognize USA Football and organized the 2017 Women's World Championships, which the USA won.

In March 2018, the Court of Arbitration for Sport (CAS) determined that the IFAF (NY) was the proper governing entity and voided all decisions of the other IFAF entity, including their decision to strip USA Football of its recognition. USA Football is currently the internationally recognized governing body for American football in the United States.

See also

 National Football League
 List of leagues of American and Canadian football

References

External links
 

IFAF Americas
Foot
American football in the United States
Youth sport in the United States
Sports organizations established in 2002
2002 establishments in the United States
Non-profit organizations based in Indianapolis